The Bachchan is an Indian surname which may refer to:

The Bachchan family is a family whose founder Harivanshrai Bachchan was Pandey of Srivastava subcaste. Notable members include:

 Abhishek Bachchan, Indian actor, son of Amitabh Bachchan
 Aishwarya Rai Bachchan, Indian actress and 1994 Miss World, married to Abhishek
 Amitabh Bachchan, Indian film actor
 Harivansh Rai Bachchan, Hindi poet and author; father of Amitabh 
 Jaya Bachchan, Indian actress, wife of Amitabh and mother of Abhishek
 Teji Bachchan, social activist, wife of Harivansh, mother of Amitabh

Two films:
 Bachchan (2013 film), a 2013 Kannada-language film
 Bachchan (2014 film), a 2014 Bengali-language film

References